Rotem Or, professionally known as Totemo, is an Israeli singer-songwriter and producer from Tel Aviv signed under a German-based management company I Am You Music Group. She plays the electric guitar and keyboard while performing. She has toured Israel and other countries including Uganda, Poland, (Germany), South Korea and Austria.

Musical career

She released her first EP titled Lightly Easily at the age of 18 under her birth name Rotem Or. The album featured seven songs. Lightly Easily was released under a Jerusalem-based label The Basement, a sub label of the Jerusalem label Fact Records.

In 2012, she released an eleven-song LP called Hard Magic which was all written, produced and recorded by herself in her home.

In 2014, Rotem Or released her Heavy as My Dreams album as Totemo under BLDG5 a sub label of a Tel Aviv record label Anova Records. The lead single "Host" had widespread publicity in Israel as it was part of the daily rotation on a prominent Israeli radio station GLFLTZ FM.

Totemo went on to release another EP titled Desire Path in 2016 which she co-produced with Roey Avital from the band Garden City Movement.

Totemo has toured the world performing at festivals such as the Milege World Music Festival in Entebbe Uganda in November 2017, the annual InDnegev festival in Israel and Zandari Festa in Seoul in South Korea.

Totemo has worked with other Israel artists including Amit Erez, Alon Lotringer, Roey Avital, Mo Kolours and shared stage with a multitude of other Israeli artists.

Personal life and breast cancer
Both Rotem's parents used to work in the Israel Air Force. Rotem grew up on a military base for most of her childhood until she was 12 when her family moved to Modiin.

Rotem Or did her mandatory military service after high school and went on to join the Hebrew University of Jerusalem where she obtained a Bachelor of Science degree in Biology and Psychology majoring in Brain Science.

Totemo was diagnosed with breast cancer in 2014 but went on to tour even during her chemotherapy. Her latest album Desire Path was all written during her fight with cancer and its single "Hits" which too attracted a lot of media attention, details her journey in a video. Totemo is now cured of cancer.

Discography

Albums

References

External links
 Totemo Discography (Discogs)

Living people
Musicians from Tel Aviv
Dream pop musicians
Israeli electronic musicians
21st-century Israeli women singers
Israeli guitarists
Israeli women singer-songwriters
Israeli pop singers
1985 births
Israeli record producers
21st-century guitarists
21st-century women guitarists